The Hospitality Branch is a  tributary of the Great Egg Harbor River in southeastern New Jersey in the United States.

The Hospitality Branch starts several miles east of Glassboro and joins the Great Egg Harbor River at Penny Pot.

See also
List of rivers of New Jersey

References

Rivers of New Jersey
Rivers in the Pine Barrens (New Jersey)
Rivers of Gloucester County, New Jersey
Tributaries of the Great Egg Harbor River